Stigmella pyri is a moth of the family Nepticulidae. It is found from Sweden to the Pyrenees, Italy and Bulgaria, and from Great Britain to Ukraine.

The wingspan is 4.2-5.2 mm. Adults are on wing from May to June and again in August in two generations.

The larvae feed on Pyrus betulifolia and Pyrus communis. They mine the leaves of their host plant. The mine consists of a corridor, sometimes forming a secondary blotch. In the first section, the frass is concentrated in a broad central line.

References

External links
Fauna Europaea
bladmineerders.nl

Nepticulidae
Moths of Europe
Moths described in 1865